Simonas Bilis (born 11 November 1993) is a Lithuanian swimmer. He is the current national record holder in the 50-meter, 100-meter freestyle (long course) and 50-meter, 100-meter freestyle (short course).

Bilis represented Lithuania at the 2015 World Aquatics Championships where he finished 20th in 50m freestyle. In 2016, he broke national record with 48.64 in men's 100m freestyle and qualified for 2016 Olympics. He finished 8th place in the 50 meter Freestyle at the Rio 2016 Summer Olympics.

In November 2022 Bilis announced about his retirement from sport.

International Swimming League 
In the Autumn of 2019 he was member of the inaugural International Swimming League swimming for the Energy Standard Swim Club, who won the team title in Las Vegas, Nevada, in December. Since 2019 he has trained with the club full-time.

Personal bests

International championships (50 m)

 Team Lithuania was disqualified in the heats

References

External links
 
 
 
 
 

1993 births
Living people
Lithuanian male freestyle swimmers
Olympic swimmers of Lithuania
Swimmers at the 2016 Summer Olympics
Swimmers at the 2020 Summer Olympics
Medalists at the FINA World Swimming Championships (25 m)
Sportspeople from Panevėžys